The Guckenheimer Sour Kraut Band was a humorous musical group of amateur and professional musicians living in the San Francisco Bay Area in California, area who played a repertoire of polkas and light classical music while adopting a persona of mild confusion and wearing self-created uniforms once described as rejects from the Franco-Prussian War. The group originally formed one Christmas season in 1949 to play carols in Sausalito, California, and someone brought a book of polka music, possibly one of the "Hungry Five" books by Harry L. Alford whose music became a basic part of the Guckenheimer repertoire. The group became increasingly popular in northern California, often invited to play at wine festivals and openings and in later years for such august occasions as opening night of the San Francisco Symphony and the opera.

Although all were business professionals, the group joined Local 6 of the American Federation of Musicians and became "professional musicians" when they were invited by San Francisco Records to make its first record album, "Oom-Pah-Pah In Hi-Fi"—described on its front cover as "The sourest German village band music ever!" Although the group played for laughs, all its members were quite excellent musicians.

The occasional native German-born listener would often remark on the Guckenheimers' similarity to actual village bands back in the old country. The village band sound was authentic enough that RCA Victor signed the group to record a second album, "Sour Kraut In Hi Fi" (LPM-1453)

The name of the group was taken from an obscure brand of whiskey and adopted by the group's leader, Richard B. Gump, who took on the persona of Herr Doktor Fritz Guckenheimer, Kapellmeister. All of the other band members adopted names that were some variant of Schmidt.
Gump was a San Francisco art dealer and owner of Gump's store in downtown San Francisco, which was also the recording location of their best known record album for RCA Victor Records "Music For Non-Thinkers" (LSP/LPM 1721), which was recorded on Sunday, December 29, 1957, in stereo. It was released in 1958. It was re-released on an unknown date, and kept the original stereo catalog number, but adopted a new per-side catalog number as well, J2PY-2451/J2PY-2452.

Personnel
Dr. Fritz Guckenheimer - Director, Arranger, and Vocalist (Richard B. Gump).
Ernst Schmid - Fluegelhorn (Dick Hiatt, a renowned architect; as a young man he played viola in the San Francisco Symphony)
Rudi Schmitt - Trumpet (Robert McDonnell, a fireman with the Southern Pacific Railroad.)
Ludwig Schmitz - Trombone (George "Cookie" Conroy, a salesman with Crown-Zellerbach Paper Corp.)
Otto Schmits - First Clarinet (Robert Entriken, an executive with the Fireman's Fund Insurance Group, later a professor at Golden Gate University.)
Johann Sebastian Schmidtz III - Second Clarinet and stand in leader when Gump not there(Paul Faria, an interior designer and cabinetmaker and leader of his own professional dance band.)
Heinrich Schwerdt - Tuba (Bob Kellogg, professional musician and owner of two music stores with his wife Aureba.)
Hugo Schmid - Bass Drum and Cymbal (George Lichty, creator of the nationally famous syndicated newspaper cartoon Grin and Bear It.) Lichty was listed specifically in the Local 6 directory as playing "Bass Drum and Cymbal" for he played no other percussion. His was the responsibility for the "boom-chik-chik" rhythm of all the waltz-time numbers.
Wolfgang Schwett - Cornet (Dean Coleman, an inspector for the Pacific Fire Rating Bureau and part-time music teacher. He did not appear on the first album.)

Earlier band members, before the records were made, included Esquire writer Barney Harrold, cabinetmaker George Phoedovius, designer George Ashley and business executive Harry Mohler.

George Lichty created the cover art for the first two albums, both being comic representations of the band in Lichty's inimitable cartoon style including the "Gückenheimer Über Alles" legend on the bass drum. The third album's cover was a photograph of the band, or at least eight members of it as (according to a note on the reverse side) "Johann Sebastian Schmidtz III was not present -- he overslept." There was, however, a ninth character on the cover, as the band was arrayed before a casting of the famous "The Thinker" statue by Auguste Rodin on display at the Palace of the Legion of Honor in San Francisco. The statue, wearing earmuffs, is identified as an "unmoved sitting bystander."

On the second album, Gump—or rather, Herr Doktor Guckenheimer—wrote a short note addressed to "Dear Music-Lovers:"

Discography and track listings
San Francisco Records TM-5 "Oom-Pah-Pah in HiFi", 1956 (San Francisco Records was later taken over by Barbary Coast Records, which gave it the catalog number BC-33005).

Side 1
 Trink Mir Noch Ä Tröpfche
 Gaudeamus
 Die Wacht Am Rhein
 Lauterbach
 Rain Rain Polka
 Present Arms
 Hi-Le-Hi-Lo
 Schuhplattler Tanze

Side 2
 Under The Double Eagle
 Vilia
 Village Tavern Polka
 Kommt Ein Vogel Geflogen
 Blue Danube
 Bier Her, Bier Her
 Alte Kamaraden March

RCA Victor LP 1453: "Sour Kraut in Hi-Fi", 1957

Side 1
 Poet And Peasant Overture
 Ach Ich Bin So Müde Polka
 Hamburger Waltz
 Warum So Schnell Gallop
 Gesellschafts Lieder
 Hortensie Polka
 L'Estudiantina
 Wien-Wien

Side 2
 Tinker Polka
 Skater's Waltz
 Sobra Las Olas
 Springtime Polka
 Wiener Blut
 Tyroler Walzer
 Der Lustige Musikant Polka
 Drink Mein Liebling

RCA Victor also made a 45 rpm Extended Play version of Sour Kraut In Hi-Fi (EPS 1-1453) which has four selections:
 Wien-Wien
 Wiener Blut
 Der Lustige Musikant Polka
 Drink Mein Liebling

RCA Victor LPM-1721: "Music For Non-Thinkers", 1958

Side 1
 Second Hungarian Rhapsody
 Grad Aus Dem Wirthaus
 Katarina Polka
 In München Steht Ein Hofbrau Haus
 Jägermarsch
 Um Die Ecke Rum
 In Der Heimat Da Gibt's Ein Wiederseh'n
 Stars And Striped Forever

Side 2
 Raymond Overture
 Kommes Ein Birdie Yet
 Trinklieder
 Gruss Aus Minneapolis
 Der Kuss (II Bacio)
 Mädel Wasch Dich
 Rheinwein Polka
 Come Vere The Band Ist Playing

Sources

 Liner notes—Oom-Pah-Pah In Hi Fi
 Liner notes—Sour Kraut in Hi-Fi
 Liner Notes—Music For Non Thinkers

External links
 Guckenheimer Sour Kraut site

Disbanded American orchestras
Musical groups established in 1949
1949 establishments in California